Beauchief and Greenhill ward—which includes the districts of Batemoor, Beauchief, Chancet Wood, Greenhill, Jordanthorpe, Lowedges and Meadowhead—is one of the 28 electoral wards in the City of Sheffield, England. The population of the ward in 2016 was estimated to be 19,669 people in 9,209 houses.

It is one of the five wards that form the Sheffield Heeley parliamentary constituency.

The districts of this ward were in the historic county of Derbyshire, but they were annexed into the county borough of Sheffield in 1934, associated with the West Riding of Yorkshire, and were therefore included in the metropolitan county of South Yorkshire in 1974.

Parks and recreation
About a third of the area of the ward is taken up by the grounds of Beauchief Abbey and Beauchief Hall. These include Ladies' Spring Wood, Parkbank Wood, Beauchief Park, and two golf courses. Also within the ward are Hutcliffe Wood and Chancet Wood.

Schools
Schools in this ward include Meadowhead School, Greenhill Primary,  Lower Meadow Primary Academy and Lowedges Junior Academy.

Districts in Beauchief and Greenhill ward

Beauchief
Beauchief  is a former village that has become a suburb of Sheffield.  It lies on a hill above the River Sheaf and the Abbeydale Industrial Hamlet.

Beauchief is notable for two buildings, still surrounded by parkland: Beauchief Abbey and Beauchief Hall.

Beauchief Abbey
Beauchief Abbey was built in 1183 by the canons who had mills on the River Sheaf and a sheep grange on Strawberry Lee. It was named  Beau meaning beautiful and chief meaning headland.

The abbey was founded in 1175, Beauchief Abbey was the only Premonstratensian abbey in the West Riding of Yorkshire.

In  the Chaworth family donated the whole village of Greenhill to the monastery at Beauchief.

The ruined abbey buildings were dismantled to provide stone for the construction of Beauchief Hall in 1671 with the exception of the bell tower. The tower area was converted into the Pegge family chapel, the interior displays several armorial plaques of Pegge family members.

The carp pond is well known spot for local anglers. The ponds are also frequented by heron and other waterfowl.

Beauchief abbey farm was built around 1700. The farm, as well as its pond, fed the monks.

The path up to Bradway passes near Beauchief Hall.

Beauchief Abbey House
Beauchief Abbey House is a group of houses on Beauchief Abbey Lane. It is situated at the bottom of the lane in view of the abbey. The barn adjacent to Beauchief Abbey House has been identified as dating from the early 16th century and a modern house in limestone and steel has been built next to the main house. Archaeological work has been made in the grounds of house but not yet been published.

Beauchief Hall
Beauchief Hall is a large manor house on the high ground of Beauchief. The house was built in 1671 by Edward Pegge of the Ashbourne family who had acquired the estate by marriage to Gertrude Strelley in 1648. Pegge served as Sheriff of Derbyshire in 1667 whilst resident in Pegge's cottage the house adjacent to the current hall. A fireplace in the hall shows a bust of Edward Pegge with the arms of the Pegge and Strelley families, the fireplace is said to have been a gift from the Mundy family.

The hall and grounds passed from the family with the sale of the property by Edward Strelley Pegge Burnell in 1923. Ending Joseph Hunter's statement in Hallamshire 1819 that "We have in this family an instance, which by some has been supposed rare, of the direct descendants of the original grantee possessing and residing upon the abbey-lands granted to their ancestor"

From 1923 the house served as a school (De la Salle College), In 1958, the Hall and grounds were acquired by the De La Salle College, the grounds being used as playing fields for the college boys. For six years, the Hall was on lease to the Beauchief Independent Grammar School for Girls, and was subsequently a hotel. The hall itself is now in private ownership. Some outhouses have been turned into private houses and other businesses and organisations own the remaining  buildings on the site. 

Beauchief also had a railway station on Abbey Lane. See Beauchief railway station for full article.

Greenhill
Greenhill ( or  ) is a suburb of Sheffield, England. Nearby settlements include Bradway, Meadowhead, Abbeydale and Woodseats.

Historic Greenhill village is a Conservation Area comprising one of the most complete set of 18th & 19th century buildings in South Yorkshire. It follows the route of the ridgeway route from Gleadless to Calver. 

Extensive building on the 20th century linked Greenhill to Abbey Lane and to Woodseats. Extensive housing developments in the 1930s were added to in the 1950s and 1960s when the primary school, the library and St Peter’s. Church were all built. The main shopping area was created on Bocking Lane at this time. 

The Greenhill Hall site of 220 acres was virgin country in 1952, but the area was populated with 3176 dwellings by 1962 during the redevelopment of post-war Sheffield by J. L. Womersley's town planning department. This area is known as Lowedges but history is traced by the name Greenhill Park which is in Lowedges, and now marks the very southern boundary of Sheffield.  This comprised a diversity of homes, including bed-sitting room flats for single occupants to four-bedroom houses, two shopping centres, a primary school, a residential home and a health centre. The neighbourhood contains some groups of houses designed on Radburn principles to separate the inhabitants from traffic.

Greenhill has a library, primary school, church and shops. There are also several bus routes which service the area including the 76, 86, 25, 25A, M17 and 293; the last service of which even goes into Derbyshire.

Chancet Wood
Chancet Wood is part of the Meadowhead area, it consists mainly of a housing estate and a woodland area with the same name. In its area is a caterers, a nursery, a children's centre and primary school. The area has its own football team Chancet Wood F.C. which is part of The FA Sheffield & District Fair Play League.

Local Transport - Stagecoach 76a (Chancet Wood-Arundel Gate)

Lowedges

Lowedges has some 3,000 homes and is located at the southern edge of the city on the boundary with Derbyshire. It was built on the grounds of Greenhill Hall (now demolished) which gave its name to Greenhill Park in Lowedges which marks the southern boundary of Sheffield.  Lowedges is formed of council and private houses and flats as well as a good selection of shops and one public house, The Grennel Mower.

The original name "Lowedges" was given to a farm located on the east side of the Sheffield to Derby Turnpike, now called Chesterfield Road. The farm itself was made up of several strips, located on both sides of the Turnpike which had in their names the word Lowedge. "Lowedge" in this context, is a description rather than a name, "low" being the Derbyshire name for a hill and "edge", meaning just that, a strip on the edge of a hill or low. Renting some of these strips and bring them together into a single farming unit would have prompted the tenant, one William Webster, to call this new farm "Lowedges".

Lowedges is home to the Transport Recreation Ground, Lowedges Fire Station, Greenhill Park, Greenhill and Bradway Youth Club, a Tenants' Meeting Hall, and three churches. It is also home to The Terminus Initiative formed by the co-operation of four local churches to build an organisation capable of helping residents engage in projects and activities and provide help where needed. The Terminus Initiative runs The Terminus Cafe, a regular meeting place for residents run by volunteers, and offers a range of services in partnership with Sheffield Council. It is a world-renowned venture and has been visited by delegations from both UK based and overseas organisations.

A map of Greenhill derived from a survey made by W & J Fairbank in 1804 and 1805 shows and names the strips. Five of the seven strips rented by William Webster include the word Lowedge. In addition, the map depicts a "Lowedge Lane" running adjacent to the east of those strips. In total there are nine fields shown with Lowedge in their name. The strip names were made up of an additional descriptor, such as "Long", "Top", "Nether", "Upper", "Five Acre" and "Four Acre". It is possible that more strips existed to the east of Lowedge Lane, that being the eastern extent of the map. The map is available from Sheffield City Libraries.

A single row of terrace houses along the west side of the southern part of Chesterfield Road forms one of the most southerly groups of buildings in Sheffield, and is the second place to carry the name Lowedges. This terrace of houses was built between 1905 and 1910 when Lowedges Farm still existed. When the terrace was built the name Lowedges became the name of this hamlet, including both the farm and the houses.

Local Transport – First South Yorkshire 76 (Meadowhall–Lowedges via City Centre) and 24 (Woodhouse–Lowedges–Bradway via City Centre but only goes to Bradway evenings and all day Sunday) terminate at Lowedges Terminus. These are high frequency buses during the day time.

Batemoor
Batemoor is a housing estate in the south of Sheffield. It is located to the southeast of Greenhill and borders Lowedges, Jordanthorpe and Dronfield.

The estate was built circa 1964, and consists largely of prefabricated flat-roofed housing, along with blocks of maisonettes/flats.

It borders on the Derbyshire countryside and farming country, being only a couple of miles from the villages of Coal Aston and Holmesfield and on the edge of the town of Dronfield.

The estate is served by First South Yorkshire 75 (Shiregreen – Jordanthorpe) and Stagecoach 1 (High Green – Jordanthorpe).

Sheffield Artist Pete McKee grew up on Batemoor and still lives in the area.

Batemoor is home to Lower Meadow Primary Academy which is located on Batemoor Road and can be accessed via public transport. It is also home to Meadowhead School which is located on Dyche Lane toward the top end of Batemoor.

Jordanthorpe
Jordanthorpe is located to the east of Batemoor and south of Norton. It is a housing estate consisting of houses and flats. Jordanthorpe is surrounded by 3 main roads; Dyche Lane which separates Jordanthorpe and Batemoor, this road leads towards Dronfield and Norton. The A6102 (Bochum Parkway) runs north and connects to Lowedges, Greenhill and Meadowhead. The final main road is Jordanthorpe Parkway, this road surrounds the remaining area of Jordanthorpe and runs underneath Batemoor, it connects the A6102 to the A61.

Jordanthorpe Centre is a shopping area located between Dyche Road and Dyche Lane. It includes a hair salon, convenience stores (Heron Foods and Nisa Jordanthorpe Food & Wine), a Chinese takeaway, a fish and chip shop and a Post Office. Just outside of the centre is the Jordanthorpe Health Centre and White Willows (Assisted Living Residence). White Willows is located on the site of the former Jordanthorpe Complex, it consisted of 3 tower blocks, each 15 storeys tall, named; Chantry (demolished in 2012), Ramsey and Rhodes (Demolished in 2001).

To the north along the A6102 is the St James Retail Park, sited on the grounds of the former Sheffield College Norton Campus and just across the road from Meadowhead School. Stores on the site include a:

 M&S Simply Food
 Aldi
 Next
 TK Maxx
 Superdrug
 Mountain Warehouse
 Pets at Home
 Homesense
 Costa
 Shoezone
 Card Factory
 Greggs

Just next to St James Retail Park is the new Graves Health and Sports Centre. Its facilities include a Gym, Pools, Studios, Tennis Courts and a Gymnastics and Trampolining Hall.

In recent years there have been multiple housing developments; A new block of houses was built around Dyche Drive which includes private parking for residents. In 2017/18 a row of 4 houses was built at the corner of Dyche Road and Dyche Close.

Public transport is provided by First South Yorkshire Route 75 (Shiregreen – Jordanthorpe) and Stagecoach Route 1 (High Green – Jordanthorpe), both of these buses go through the city centre. This is a high-frequency bus during day time.

Meadowhead 
There is a Morrisons supermarket, along with two primary schools: Abbey Lane and St Thomas of Canterbury (Catholic).

References

External links
 Sources for the history of Beauchief Produced by Sheffield City Council's Libraries and Archives

Wards of Sheffield